The Dozo (also Donzo, Bambara for hunter, pl. donzow) are traditional hunters in northern Côte d'Ivoire, southeast Mali, and Burkina Faso, and members of a co-fraternity containing initiated hunters and sons of Dozo, called a Donzo Ton. Not an ethnic group, the Dozo are drawn mostly from Mandé-speaking groups, but are also found among Dyula-speaking communities, Dogon, and most other ethnic groups in Côte d'Ivoire. Dozo societies increased in the last decades of the twentieth century, and Dozo groups came into political prominence during the Ivorian Civil War.

Donzo Ton 
The Donzo Ton (tɔn is a Manding word for age-group, religious, or vocational associations) are one of a number of hunting fraternities common in Mandé-speaking areas of West Africa. Similar, and in the case of West Africa closely related groups, exist as the Kamajor in Sierra Leone, Poro in Liberia, the Mayi-Mayi in Democratic Republic of the Congo, and the Karamojong in Uganda. Sons of Dozos, as well as new adherents, are able to be initiated into the Ton and undergo a series of secret rituals. There has been a long history of these hunter collectives (the Segu Bambara empire is said to have grown from such a Ton) and hunters were often viewed by farming or pastoralist neighbours as possessing special power, wisdom, and strength.  Collective organisations, as with many vocations in West Africa, existed in part to train and pass on needed skills.  Hunters, though, are found in every community, and are not a strictly inherited role.
 
It is believed that the amulets (gris-gris) worn by Dozos possess magical properties protecting them from harm, and amplifying their vision and hearing. Such amulets, inherited brown hunting clothing, as well as special hats, are said to make them bulletproof. Each local Donzo Ton is led by an elder hunter, the donzokuntigi.  Along with ritual and initiation, local Donzo Ton will meet to discuss their work, organise hunts, or settle internal grievances, often in the all-night tonsigi gathering.  In this way, the Donzo Ton operates much like a western guild.

Part of the cultural and ritual tradition of the Donzo involves sacrifice and protection of the community.  In traditional belief, wild animals killed by hunters released a nyama, a destructive spirit that afflicted the community benefiting from the kill.  Donzo Ton trained to perform rituals, cleansing the nyama and enabling them to both share their bounty with the community of non-hunters, and act as spiritual guardians of settled communities from malevolent forces of the forest or bush.

In Ivorian society and politics 
While there are records of hunter Tons going back to the Mali Empire, since the 1990s there has been a particular growth of local collectives of Donzo Ton in Côte d'Ivoire.  It is believed that this growth first originated along the border with Mali, and spread into forested regions of Côte d'Ivoire. In Mali, hunter associations were organised into a national union (l'Association Nationale des Chasseurs).  This is seen as the birth of the Benkadi, a network of Donzo Ton. By the year 2000 there were over 22,000 official members.

One explanation for the huge growth in the Benkadi network in the 1990s is the rapid increase in deforestation (and thus more scarce hunting land) in the north, economic hardship in other vocations, along with the growing insecurity across the country fed by fears of civil war spreading from Liberia and Sierra Leone. World Bank-mandated structural adjustment and a currency devaluation in 1994 helped spread an unprecedented crime wave.  These hunter groups, then, were simultaneously respected (even feared) for their power by neighbours while growing in numbers and organisation while the government slid into ethnic conflict and civil war.  In many places the Benkadi were hired or simply stepped in to fill this vacuum.

At the beginning of the 1990s, President Houphouët-Boigny had called on public-minded citizens to aid the police, and as crime increased, local officials drafted in hunters in Korhogo and Ferkessédougou.  Not only were the hunter militias successful, but their fame spread far beyond the north.  Donzow became a common sight in towns and on the roads.  They were hired by locals and both sides in the Ivorian Civil War as soldiers, to guard vehicles, direct traffic, or patrol religious sites.  This success fed into the growth of Benkadi groups in all parts of Côte d'Ivoire, as the civil war and fragile peace made local organisation of security much sought after.  In Abidjan and Bouaké. Donzo Ton leaders opened security offices, trading not only on their northern successes, but on a public perception of special (even magical) abilities of Donzow.  Unemployed men from around the country came to Korhogo and Odienné, home of Benkadi leadership, to be initiated into a Donzo Ton, and thus have access to work as well-paid security guards.

Civil War 

While Donzow became guards for hire in the unstable years before the 2002–2005 Ivorian Civil War, their network became associated with northern groups who led the rebel forces. The Donzo Ton, viewed as saviours by some in the south, were also seen as unsophisticated throwbacks to a pre-modern era by many in cosmopolitan Abidjan.  The transnational and northern source of the Donzo Ton were seen to conflict with the ethnic nationalism of Ivoirité which feared the presence of Burkinabé labourers and immigrants from Mali as not being "true" Ivorians.  Politically, it was Rassemblement des Républicains (RDR) politicians from the north who first entrusted the Donzow with policing duties, and the Donzo Ton leadership became associated with the RDR.  Nationalist Presidents Henri Konan Bédié, and later Laurent Gbagbo, condemned these armed Benkadi groups as regressive, divisive and dangerous. It was not surprising, then, when the September 2002 coup began the civil war, northern forces included many identifiable Donzow. One rebel group, the Mouvement populaire ivoirien du Grand Ouest (MPIGO) was thought to be one-fifth Donzow.  This participation, while earning the enmity of many in the south, has made leaders of the Donzo Ton Benkadi network powerful figures whose support has been sought by Prime Minister (and former rebel leader) Guillaume Soro's  Patriotic Movement of Côte d'Ivoire. Kuruma Lansine, public head of the Benkadi has become a political leader for standing by and speaking for "the dozos".

While most studies stress the stabilising nature the Donzo Ton had on the country both before and after the civil war, human rights organisations have documented a pattern of lawlessness, intimidation, and extrajudicial killings by Donzow groups beginning from at least 1997, through the 1999 coup (in which Donzo Ton set up checkpoints on roads across the north),  and the 2002–2005 war.

In Mali society 
In 2017, local civilians accused the Malian government of arming groups of Dozo, who had allegedly carried out a spate of killings of nomadic Fula populations.

In June 2018, Dozo surrounded a village in the Mopti Region, separated members of the Fula ethnic group from the other villagers and killed at least 32 of them. The Fula complain that they are being regularly targeted by the traditional hunters in the name of the fight against jihadists. They accuse the Malian military of supporting such incidents.

Music
The Dozo are also known for their praise singers (see Griot) and rituals, often accompanied by the dozo n’goni, a variant of n'goni West African lute said to have originated among the Senufo hunters of Burkina Faso.

Galerie

See also 
 Caste system in Africa
 Kamajors

References 

 "The Ivory Coast: Country Profile". Travel Africa magazine. Edition 4: Summer 1998. URL accessed 2006-02-28.
 Côte d'Ivoire. Human Rights Watch. August 2003, Volume 15, No. 14 (A).
 Thomas J. Bassett. Dangerous Pursuits: Hunter Associations (Donzo ton) and National Politics in Côte d'Ivoire. Africa: Journal of the International African Institute, Vol. 73, No. 1 (2003), pp. 1–30.
 Thomas J. Bassett. Containing the Donzow: The Politics of Scale in Côte d'Ivoire. Africa Today, Summer 2004, Vol. 50, No. 4, pp. 30–49.
Hans-U. Caspary Faune sauvage et la filière viande de brousse au Sud-est de la Côte d’Ivoire. WeißenseeVerlag, Berlin 2000.
Youssouf Diallo and István Sántha. Rituals, forms of behaviour, and solidarity among hunters’ groups in West Africa and South Siberia in Max Planck Institute for Social Anthropology Report 2004-2005, ISSN 1618-8683
Sten Hagberg. Political decentralization and traditional leadership in the Benkadi hunters' association in western Burkina Faso. Africa Today,  June, 2004.
 Joseph Hellweg. "Manimory and the Aesthetics of Mimesis: Forest, Islam, and the State in the Ivorian Hunter's Association", Africa Vol. 76, No. 1 (2006): pp. 461–484.
 Joseph Hellweg. "Encompassing the State: Sacrifice and Security in the Hunters’ Movement of Côte d'Ivoire", Africa Today Vol. 50, No. 4 (2004): pp. 3–28.
Joseph Hellweg.  "Dozo Ethics and the Spirit of Nationalism: Resistance, Civility, and Sacrifice in the Benkadi Security Movement".  American Ethnologist, (2003).
François Wandji. Les dozos, guérisseurs et "chasseurs". L'Humanité:  24 July 2001.
 COTE D’IVOIRE: THE GENERAL’S NEW CLOTHES. CDD Briefing on a fact-finding trip to Côte d'Ivoire, Centre for Democracy and Development (UK), April 2000.

External links

Dozo Hunters photographed in their traditional clothing and wearing charms: BBC, No date.
Dozo hunters in traditional garb: BBC, 19 September 2005 "pictures of the day".

History of Ivory Coast
Hunters
Ivorian culture
Society of Ivory Coast